The 1977–78 Australian region cyclone season was a below average tropical cyclone season.

Systems

Tropical Cyclone Tom

Tropical Cyclone Sam–Celimene

Severe Tropical Cyclone Trudy

Severe Tropical Cyclone Vern

Cyclone Vern formed on 27 January from one of several low pressure centres within a trough that extended from the Cocos Islands eastward across northern Australia to Queensland. Over the period of a couple days, the strong northwesterly monsoonal flow to the north of the trough interacted with the strengthening easterly winds of a high-pressure area moving into the Great Australian Bight. As a result, one of the lows rapidly deepening into a tropical cyclone off the Kimberley coast. After initially moving tracking westward out to sea, the storm executed an anticyclonic loop and proceeded to move eastward. Inland, the system tracked southwestward then to the south again, causing flooding and minor damage, before dissipating on 3 February over the Pilbara.

Tropical Cyclone Gwen

Severe Tropical Cyclone Winnie

Severe Tropical Cyclone Alby

On 27 March, a tropical depression developed in the eastern Indian Ocean between Indonesia and Australia. It drifted to the southwest, and slowly strengthened into a tropical storm on 29 March. Alby continued slowly southwestward, and attained cyclone status on 30 March. The rate of intensification, which was slower earlier in its life, became more steady towards strengthening, and reached the equivalent of Category 3 status on 1 April. Tropical Cyclone Alby turned more to the south, and quickly reached a peak of  later on 1 April. After maintaining its strength for 30 hours, Alby weakened as it turned to the southeast. Its forward momentum increased over the southeast Indian Ocean, and Alby was only an  cyclone as it passed off the southwest coast of Australia on 4 April. It continued rapidly to the southeast, and became extra-tropical on 5 April while south of the continent.

On 4 April, Tropical Cyclone Alby passed close to the southwest corner of Western Australia, killing five people and causing widespread but mostly minor damage to the southwest. The damage bill was estimated to be $39 million (2003 dollars). A man was blown from the roof of a shed and a woman was killed by a falling pine tree. Another man was killed when a tree fell on the bulldozer he was operating and two men drowned when their dinghy overturned at Albany. Storm surge and destructive waves caused coastal inundation and erosion from Perth to Busselton, damaging the Busselton Jetty and Fremantle Harbour. Fires fanned by the strong winds burned an estimated  of forest and farming land.

Tropical Cyclone Brenda

Tropical Cyclone Hal

See also

Atlantic hurricane seasons: 1977, 1978
Eastern Pacific hurricane seasons: 1977, 1978
Western Pacific typhoon seasons: 1977, 1978
North Indian Ocean cyclone seasons: 1977, 1978

References

Australian region cyclone seasons
Aust
 disasters in Australia
 disasters in Australia
 disasters in Oceania
 disasters in Oceania